The 1937–38 John Carroll Blue Streaks men's ice hockey season was the inaugural season of play for the program.

Season
John Carroll was one of four Cleveland-area teams to either found or restart a varsity ice hockey program in 1937. Those schools joined with three Pittsburgh-area teams in similar circumstances and formed the Penn-Ohio Intercollegiate Hockey League. In their first season, John Carroll rose to the top of the conference in the wake of their best player, Maine-native Eddie Arsenault. Already a fixture on the football team, Arsenault led the Blue Streaks to a 1st-place finish in their division and then marched to a conference championship against Pittsburgh. The win was the first major championship for John Carroll and the team received the Sutphin-Harris trophy for their accomplishment. The team was coached by Fred Robertson of the Cleveland Barons, the operators of the Cleveland Arena.

Roster

Standings

Schedule and results

|-
!colspan=12 style=";" | Regular Season

|-
!colspan=12 style=";" | Penn-Ohio League Playoffs

|- align="center" bgcolor="#e0e0e0"
|colspan=12|John Carroll Won Series 4–3

|- align="center" bgcolor="#e0e0e0"
|colspan=12|John Carroll Won Series 6–1

References

John Carroll Blue Streaks men's ice hockey seasons
John Carroll
John Carroll
John Carroll
John Carroll